Lev Petrovich Bulat (1947–2016) was a Russian physicist.

Bulat was born on April 11, 1947 in Chernovtsy, Ukraine. In 1988 he received a  D.Sc in Physics and Mathematics, from Leningrad Polytechnical Institute, with the thesis: "Transport Phenomena in Semiconductors under Large Temperature Gradients".

He was an expert in transport properties of semiconductors, physics of nanostructures, thermoelectric phenomena, direct energy conversion, thermoelectric cooling. He was a Professor of electrical and electronic engineering in Saint Petersburg State University of Low Temperatures and Food Engineering, Russia.

He died suddenly on June 12, 2016, age 69, less than two weeks after attending an international conference.

Awards and Grants 
 2009. A diploma of the International Thermoelectric Academy, Kiev, Ukraine
 2009. A grant of EERSS Program. Singapore.
 2008. A grant of the Russian Federal Agency on Sciences and Innovation
 2007. A grant of EERSS Program. Singapore.
 2006. The Certificate of Honor, the Ministry of Education and Sciences, Russian Federation.
 1996–2009.  Eleven grants of the Russian Foundation for Basic Research.
 2005. A grant of SSHN (France).
 2004, 2007. Two grants of CONACYT (Mexico).
 2003–2004. A grant of the Ministry of Education, Russian Federation .
 1997? A grant of KOSEF (Korea)
 1997. A grant of the McArthour Foundation (USA).
 1997–2000. A holder of a personal grant of the Russian Academy of Science as an outstanding scientist.
 1997. Two grants of the Material Research Society (USA).
 1993–1994. Three grants of the International Science Foundation, USA.

SOCIETIES AND ORGANIZATIONS
 2004. The Board of the International Thermoelectric Academy
 2003. The Board of the International Academy of Refrigeration
 2002. Active Member of the International Thermoelectric Academy https://web.archive.org/web/20021204093057/http://www.ite.cv.ua/ita/index.html
 1999. Honorary Member of the International Biographical Center's Advisory Council, Cambridge, England. http://www.melrosepress.co.uk/index.html
 1998. A member of the Euroscience Society (France). https://web.archive.org/web/20080115202436/http://www.euroscience.org/index.html
 1997. A member of the Branch on Thermoelectric Energy Conversion of the Science Council for the   Problem "Direct Energy Conversion", the Russian Academy of Sciences.
 1997. Active Member of the International Academy of Refrigeration. http://www.maxiar.spb.ru/conf.shtml
 1996. Head of the Section for Alternative Methods of Refrigeration of the International Academy of Refrigeration. https://web.archive.org/web/20071013151654/http://zts.com/iar
 1996. The Board of the Russian Thermoelectric Society.
 1991. The Materials Research Society, USA. http://www.mrs.org/
 1990. The International Thermoelectric Society. http://www.its.org/
 1989. The Branch on Thermoelectric Materials Research of the Science Council on the Problem "Solid State Physics", the Ukrainian Academy of Sciences.
 1982. The Branch on Thermoelectric and Photoelectric Energy Conversion of the Science Council on the Problem "Methods of Direct Energy Conversion", the Ukrainian Academy of Sciences.

Publications 
L. Bulat is the author of 9 books, 200 scientific papers and 5 patents.

Books 
1. Bulat L.P., Yang Y.S. Thermoelectric Energy Conversion with Application to Solar Energy. Seoul, Jungin I&D Co., Ltd, Korea, 2006, 80 p.

2. Afanasyeva N.A., Bulat L.P. Electrical and electronic engineering. St. Petersburg State University of Refrigeration and Food Engineering: 2006, St. Petersburg, Russia, 185 p.

3. Timofeevskiy L.S., Bulat L.P. et al. Heat and design calculation of refrigeration machines, heat pumps and heat-transformers. Part 1. Calculation of cycles, thermodynamic and thermal properties of working substances. SPbUR&FE: 2006, St. Petersburg Russia, 456 p.

4. Thermoelectric Refrigeration. Bulat L.P., Vedernikov M.V., Vyalov A.P. et al. Ed. by L.P.Bulat. St. Petersburg State University of Refrigeration and Food Engineering: 2002, St. Petersburg, Russia, 147 p.

5. Bulat L.P., Buzin E.V. Thermoelectric cooling systems. St. Petersburg State University of Refrigeration and Food Engineering: 2001, St. Petersburg, Russia, 42 p.

6. Anatychuk L.I. and Bulat L.P. Semiconductors under extreme temperature conditions. “Nauka”, St. Petersburg, 2001, Russia, 224 p.

7. Bulat L.P. Transport Phenomena in Semiconductors under Large Temperature Gradients. LPI, Leningrad, 1987, 300 p.

8. Bulat L.P. and Tomchuk P.M. Solution of kinetic equation under condition of strong heterogeneity. Kiev, Institute of Physics, 1987.

9. Bulat L.P., Demchishin E.I., Snarsky A.A. and Tomchuk P.M. Non-linear effective kinetic coefficients in heterogeneous media. Kiev, Institute of Physics, 1984.

Patents 
 Bulat L.P. et al. The Bearing Unit // Patent # SU 1765567. Priority from 08.02.89. Published 30.09.92. USSR.
 Anatychuk L.I., Bulat L.P. and Jatsjuk V.G. Thermoelement // Patent # SU 1630577. Priority from 20.01.88. USSR.
 Bulat L.P. and Gutsal D.D. The Linear Motor // Patent # SU 1394348. Priority from 23.07.85. Published 07.05.88. USSR.
 Bulat L.P. and Demchishin E.I. The Method of Generating Transverse Thermoelectric Power in Single Crystals of High Symmetry // Patent # SU 1484215. Priority from 12.01.87. USSR.
 Bulat L.P. and Gutsal D.D. The Heat Flux Sensor // Patent # SU 1545103.  Priority from 10.11.87. Published 23.02.90. USSR.

References

Russian physicists
1947 births
Living people